Polystira starretti is a species of sea snail, a marine gastropod mollusk in the family Turridae, the turrids.

Description

Distribution

References

 Petuch E.J. (2002). New deep water gastropods from the Bimini Shelf, Bimini Chain, Bahamas. Ruthenica. 12(1): 59–72
 Bouchet, P.; Fontaine, B. (2009). List of new marine species described between 2002-2006. Census of Marine Life.

External links
  Todd J.A. & Rawlings T.A. (2014). A review of the Polystira clade — the Neotropic's largest marine gastropod radiation (Neogastropoda: Conoidea: Turridae sensu stricto). Zootaxa. 3884(5): 445-491

starretti
Gastropods described in 2002